Dale is an unincorporated community in Washington Township in Berks County, Pennsylvania, United States. Dale is located at the intersection of Forgedale  and Dale Roads.

References

Unincorporated communities in Berks County, Pennsylvania
Unincorporated communities in Pennsylvania